Boor may refer to:

boor, a peasant or uncultured person; one who lacks in education, knowledge, refinement and social graces 
 bur, defined by the Rambam (Maimonides). A bur is a person having neither (ethical) Torah education nor virtues of manners (derekh eretz) nor the ability to acquire them. Commonly translated as "boor".
Balanda Boor, also Boor, an ethnic group in South Sudan
The Boor (play) or The Bear, an 1888 play by Anton Chekhov
The Boor (opera), a 1968 opera by Ulysses Kay based on Chekhov's play
The Boor, a 1957 opera, first performed in 2017, by Dominick Argento
The Boors, an 18th-century comedy by Carlo Goldoni

See also
Bore (disambiguation)
Boer
de Boor, surname disambiguation page